Gavani (also Romanized as Gāvānī; also known as Yavony) is a village in Garmeh-ye Jonubi Rural District, in the Central District of Meyaneh County, East Azerbaijan Province, Iran. At the 2006 census, its population was 60, in 9 families.

References 

Populated places in Meyaneh County